Saint-Antonin-de-Lacalm (Languedocien: Sent Antonin de la Calm) is a former commune in the Tarn department in southern France. On 1 January 2019, it was merged into the new commune Terre-de-Bancalié.

Geography
The commune is traversed by the river Dadou.

Population

See also
Communes of the Tarn department

References

Former communes of Tarn (department)
Populated places disestablished in 2019